Caecum insularum is a species of minute sea snail, a marine gastropod mollusc or micromollusk in the family Caecidae.

Distribution

Description
The maximum recorded shell length is 3.4 mm.

Habitat
Minimum recorded depth is 1.5 m. Maximum recorded depth is 1.5 m.

References

External links

Caecidae
Gastropods described in 1969